Demerje is a settlement within the City of Zagreb, Croatia. The settlement is administered as a part of the City of Zagreb.
According to national census of 2011, population of the settlement is 721.

Sources

Populated places in the City of Zagreb